Friendly Neighborhood Spider-Man is a comic book series that was published by Marvel Comics.  The title is derived from a trademark self-referential comment often made by Spider-Man (as in "just another service provided by your friendly neighborhood Spider-Man!").  The first series began in October 2005 and was primarily written by Peter David.
Friendly Neighborhood Spider-Man was canceled after issue #24, part 2 of J. Michael Straczynski and Joe Quesada's controversial "One More Day" storyline. Kurt Busiek has revealed that in 1995 he originally suggested "Friendly Neighborhood Spider-Man" as the title of the series which was eventually published as Untold Tales of Spider-Man.

In March 2019 a new volume was launched by writer Tom Taylor and artist Juan Cabal and lasted 14 issues, ending in February 2020.

Storylines (Volume 1)

"The Other" (issues #1-4)

The first story arc is the twelve-part crossover, "Spider-Man: The Other", one-third of which was told in Friendly Neighborhood Spider-Man (the other two-thirds told in Marvel Knights Spider-Man and The Amazing Spider-Man).

"Web Log" (issue #5)
"Web Log" was a one-issue storyline featuring a young woman, Vanna Smith, who is convinced Spider-Man has been stalking her since high school, because over the years, Spider-Man just happened to be around when Vanna was doing something.  She later gets a restraining order against Spider-Man.  The story then moves to approximately 50 years into the future.  Mary Jane meets up with Vanna in an unidentified park.  They talk, and Mary Jane shows Vanna Spider-Man's bloodied mask, thus proving her thoughts of him surviving were wrong.  Mary Jane then walks away.

"Masks" (issues #6-7)
A storyline notable for its use of luchadores, lucha libre, and discussion of the meaning of being an icon. Spider-Man also struggles with the combination of both science and magic in his origin, and uses scientific means to take down a magic foe.

"Jumping the Tracks" (issues #8-10)
The story begins in an alternate, future timeline. The daughter of Spider-Man 2211 (nicknamed Hobby) is the alternate Hobgoblin. She enjoys killing alternate or future versions of Spider-Man, but accidentally dies by her own retcon bomb (a bomb that not only kills the victim, but erases them from ever existing). Early in the storyline, she brings an alt-Uncle Ben to the 616 reality as part of a mind game for Peter. As Spider-Man 2211 prepares to return Uncle Ben to his proper reality, Uncle Ben shoots him, deciding to stay in this one. This Uncle Ben is later revealed to be the Chameleon of 2211.

"I Hate a Mystery" (issues #11-13)
Faced with the unbridled anger and hatred of protesting parents, as well as his own sense of responsibility for potentially endangering his students by revealing his secret identity in support of Iron Man's Pro-Registration movement, Peter decides to resign his station as science teacher in Midtown high. Telling the principal he intends to "finish out the day."

Also of note is the inclusion of Miss Arrow, a nurse who falls in love with Flash Thompson and may be more than she seems: she is able to emit stingers from her wrist, much like Spider-Man himself. Flash, angry at Peter for "pretending" to be Spider-Man, challenges Peter to a game of dodgeball, during which Peter immediately hits flash in the face, giving him two black eyes.

Before after school programs are completed, Francis Klum returns as the new Mysterio and traps Spider-Man and the students and staff of Midtown High inside the building, within an impenetrable cloud of noxious gasses. As the police and terrified parents surround the school and look for a way in, Daniel Berkhart, the second Mysterio, appears and promises to end "this fiasco", walking unchallenged through the smoke and into the school.

Inside, Spider-Man seeks out Francis Klum's Mysterio, as Flash Thompson and Miss Arrow help the remaining students escape the school.   Berkhart's Mysterio reveals he is only there to "help" in order to end Klum's short time donning the Mysterio visage, calling the new Mysterio a "little rat, scurrying around and nibbling on the accoutrements of your betters." 
As the two Mysterios fight, Spider-Man calmly hangs out on the ceiling, reading the local sports section of the newspaper. Ultimately, Spidey finished off Berkhart with the help of his spider-sense. 
During this, Flash finally admits to himself that Peter really is Spider-Man, and helps his old friend save the students, as well as take down the villainous Klum, saving Spider-Man's life in the process. After this, Flash and Peter re-establish their friendship.

During all of this, Quinten Beck, the original Mysterio, has also appeared at the school, although only revealing himself to Francis Klum, before fading to the background as Francis Klum and Daniel Berkhart battle over the mantle of Mysterio. 
Beck, displaying the use of never-before-seen powers, snatches Miss Arrow from Flash and the group of students, and tells her that their "Superiors" have use for Spider-Man remaining at the school, instructing her to convince Peter to remain as a science teacher for the time being. Beck removes his helmet, revealing himself to be missing half of his head, a telltale reminder of his previous death, by suicide.

"Taking Wing" (issues #14-16)
The Vulture is recruited to kill off Spider-Man because he is now "Beside the Law". Meanwhile, Spider-Man receives a cloaking device from Beast in an abandoned church and uses the device to get a job at Midtown (as Ben Reilly). In the second issue familiar characters are brought back (including Debra Whitman and Betty Brant). Deb has written a book titled “TWO FACED: How Spider-Man Ruined My Life.”  The Vulture predicts Peter will show up and a battle is staged in medias res. The issue ends with the Vulture and Spider-Man falling off of a building.  As they fall, Spider-Man gains his composure long enough to save himself and the Vulture and take Toomes to the hospital. Meanwhile, Deb Whitman confesses to Betty Brant that the Daily Bugle pressured her and gave her money to write the scathing  tell-all book, and apologizes. As Vulture lies in a paralyzed state in the hospital, Spider-Man sneaks in his room using his cloaking device.  Vulture asks him to kill him, as his state is a sign of weakness, but he knows Peter won't.  He then says that Peter's uncle is lucky for dying, so he wouldn't see how weak his nephew is.  Spider-Man snaps and puts a pillow over Toomes' face as he struggles for life.  At the last second Peter relents, stating for that a man who wants to die so bad, he struggled pretty hard.  He leaves Toomes with a statement about how compassion is a good thing.

"Sandblasted" (issues #17-19)
Starting with the "Back In Black" storyline, Spider-Man now hides out under the guise of Ben Reilly and takes a job as Flash Thompson's assistant coach. Soon, Flash realizes Ben is Peter and offers him shelter at his apartment. While resting, Peter is visited by Flint Marko a.k.a. Sandman. Sandman had earlier broken into prison to rescue Floyd Baker, his father, but failed and enlisted Spider-Man to help by claiming the man Baker murdered was Ben Parker (see issues #8-10) though he'd been dead for years. Along the way they meet a stoner named Dennis who had seen Ben Parker shoot Spider-Man 2211 and taken the murdered Spider-Man 2211's helmet and was waiting to go to the future. Meanwhile, Flash Thompson was on a date with Betty Brant until she was attacked in the restroom by thousands of spiders. Upon inspection, cocaine was discovered and the matrie'd asked them to leave. Miss Arrow appeared soon after, as she had been hiding in the stall. Afterwards, Betty distracted Flash and caused them to wreck a police car. Taking the helmet (and allowing the stoner to come along), Spider-Man and Sandman followed its instructions to Midtown High where they discovered the mystery. The Ben Parker that the Hobgoblin 2211 had derailed from the timeline was murdered and a Chameleon 2211 had ingested his DNA and morphed into him. Revealing its true form, Spider-Man and Sandman were able to stop the creature moments before Floyd Baker was executed. Yet something puzzled Spider-Man; the helmet had registered 11,000 targets in the school with Chameleon, but he was alone when they found him.

Collected editions

Volume 1

Volume 2

See also
List of Spider-Man titles

References

External links
Friendly Neighborhood Spider-Man at Marvel.com

2000s comics
2005 comics debuts
2007 comics endings
2010s comics
2020 comics endings
2020s comics
Comics by Peter David